Kevin  "Cowboy" Neale (born 18 July 1945) is a former Australian rules footballer who played in the Victorian Football League (VFL).

St Kilda 
Recruited from South Warrnambool, and nicknamed "Cowboy" for his bow-legs and his rolling gait, Neale played his first match for St Kilda against North Melbourne on 22 May 1965 (round 6), as a back-pocket/ruckman. His debut had been delayed because his own club, South Warrnambool, had needed him as a player for the first three matches of their season.

Neale, recruited by St Kilda as a nineteen-year-old,  ruckman, initially played in the backline (as the first change, resting in the back-pocket ruckman), but was moved to full forward in 1966. (Neale was selected as the back-pocket ruckman in St Kilda's "Team of the Century" in May 2001.)

He kicked five goals in St Kilda's 1966 Grand Final win over Collingwood; and held the club record of 16 finals games, until it was beaten by Robert Harvey.

Neale played for Victoria in the interstate match against Tasmania in Hobart, on Saturday, 16 June 1967. He was selected at full-forward, and kicked four goals in the match (he was moved from full-forward in the second half because Victoria's centre half-forward Peter McKenna had not kicked a goal in the first half of the match).

At the end of the 1976 season, it was thought that Neale would retire from playing with St Kilda; however, St Kilda prevailed upon him to play yet another season, and he played in 20 of St Kilda's 22 matches that season, playing his last match as the back-pocket ruckman, in a losing St Kilda side, 17.10 (112), against Richmond 25.21 (171) at the MCG on 27 August 1977 (round 22).

In his entire VFL career at St Kilda, he had played in 256 games, and scored 301 goals (as at the end of the 2010 season, only 5 other men have played more matches for St Kilda, and only 8 others have kicked more goals in their career).

Australian Capital Territory

1978 
Towards the end of his career at St Kilda, numerous offers were made to Neale to leave St Kilda and take up a coaching position. At the start of 1975, he was offered the position of playing coach at Turvey Park in the South-West League for three years at $25,000 per annum. St Kilda talked him out of accepting the offer; and, towards the end of the 1975 season, the Albury Football Club in the Ovens & Murray Football League offered him a three-year contract of $35,000 as captain-coach.

In 1978, he moved to Canberra, and was appointed the captain-coach of the Ainslie Football Club. In that year, he was also the captain coach of a combined A.C.T. team in the Escort Cup competition. He was still very effective at full-forward, setting a goal-kicking record in 1980. With Neale as its captain-coach, Ainslie won the premiership in both 1979 and 1980.

1980 Captain-coach of the ACT 
In 1980, there was no concept of "State of Origin"; and, therefore, a combined ACT was precisely that: a team of men who were currently playing in the ACT competition.

Neale was the captain-coach of the combined ACT side that beat the Victorian team 13.17 (95) to 11.16 (82) on 6 July 1980 at Manuka Oval in front of a crowd of 10,600. He scored three goals.

Coached by Bill Stephen, the Victorians were a very strong team including club captains and Brownlow medallists: Francis Bourke of Richmond, captain, Trevor Barker of St Kilda, Malcolm Blight of North Melbourne, Terry Bright of Geelong, Jim Buckley of Carlton, Robert DiPierdomenico of Hawthorn, Jim Edmond of Footscray, Robert Elliott of Melbourne, Neville Fields of South Melbourne, Laurie Fowler of Richmond, Steven Icke of North Melbourne, Rene Kink of Collingwood, Mark Lee of Richmond, Mark Maclure of Carlton, Alex Marcou of Carlton, Merv Neagle of Essendon, Jeff Sarau of St Kilda, Laurie Serafini of Fitzroy, and Michael Turner of Geelong.

1982
For a number of reasons, Ainslie had experienced a dismal 1981 season; but, under the coaching of Neale and, particularly, due to his superb on-field leadership and strength at full-forward, Ainslie won the 1982 premiership. At the end of 1982, he was interviewed by St Kilda, with a view to him replacing Alex Jesaulenko. Neale demanded $50,000 as his salary (St Kilda eventually appointed the ex-Richmond coach Tony Jewell).

Career-ending nosocomial infection 
In 1983, he began the 1983 season as the captain-coach of the Ainslie Football Club, and was playing as well as he had ever been, despite his advanced age and increased weight.

Only a few matches into the 1983 season he suffered a relatively minor injury to his left knee, and was admitted to hospital for a simple, routine surgical repair. At the time of his admission to hospital, it was thought that he might miss two weeks at the most (and, moreover, that he still had, perhaps, another two or three seasons in him as captain-coach).

Whilst in the hospital, he came down with a very severe nosocomial infection that threatened his life; and the extremely long time that it took for him to recover meant that he never retained his fitness levels, and was only well enough to play a couple of matches at the end of the season. Although not a "passenger", he was not able to play up to his usual level of dominance; and it was clear to all that his playing career was over.

With Neale in the team, Ainslie won the 1983 premiership; the fourth in his six years as captain-coach. In the 1980 season he kicked 149 goals, in the 1981 season he kicked 139 goals, and in the 1982 season he kicked 125 goals.

South Australia 
Because he was no longer able to take the field as a player, Neale was reluctantly released by the Ainslie Football Club; as their club and team structure at the time demanded a playing coach (the club eventually appointed ex-Richmond, and ex-Collingwood player Rod Oborne as the captain-coach for the 1984 season).

Cleared by Ainslie, Neale moved to coach the Central District Football Club in the SANFL. He was non-playing coach from 1984 to 1987. He took Central District to 3rd place in the minor round in 1984 just 1 win off top position with 16 wins and 6 losses but the team lost both finals finishing in 4th. The next 3 seasons the club failed to qualify for the finals finishing in 6th in 1985 and 1986 and then 8th place in 1987.  In 1984, with Neale as coach, Central District's John Platten won the Magarey Medal.

Tuggeranong 
Neale was coach of the Tuggeranong Football Club for three seasons (1993–1995).

St Kilda Football Club
Neale currently works at the St Kilda Football Club as Coterie & Support Groups Manager.

Footnotes

References 

 St Kilda Hall of Fame Profile
 Saints honour roll

1945 births
Living people
St Kilda Football Club players
St Kilda Football Club Premiership players
Trevor Barker Award winners
Ainslie Football Club players
Ainslie Football Club coaches
Central District Football Club coaches
South Warrnambool Football Club players
Australian rules footballers from Victoria (Australia)
One-time VFL/AFL Premiership players